San Giuseppe is a Baroque architecture, Roman Catholic church building located on Via San Giuseppe, near Piazza Santa Croce, in central Florence, region of Tuscany, Italy, and is one of two churches and an oratory in the city dedicated to St Joseph.

History
The church was built on a site that once held the oratory of the Confraternity of St Joseph, and the present church designed by Baccio d'Agnolo. In 1583, the complex was deeded to the Minims of St Francis of Paola.  A new facade was completed in 1759. When the Minim order was suppressed in 1784, the convent was put to new uses.

Interior
In 1752, the interior was frescoed by Sigismondo Betti  and Pietro Anderlini. The otherwise Baroque decoration of the interior conserves a medieval painted crucifix by Lorenzo Monaco, with which the Battuti Neri or black hooded penitents from this church, accompanied those condemned to death to the scaffold outside of the city gate called Porta alla Giustizia. The interior also  contains two canvases by Santi di Tito: a Nativity and St Francesco di Paola heals the Sick.

Gallery

Sources
Derived from Italian Wikipedia entry
Guide of Art in Italy

Giuseppe Florence
Giuseppe Florence
Giuseppe Florence